Klingler is a surname. Notable people with the surname include:

Alfred Klingler (born 1912), German field handball player who competed in the 1936 Summer Olympics
Baylee Klingler (born 1999), American softball player
David Klingler (born 1969), former American football player
Gwen Klingler (born 1944), former Republican member of the Illinois House of Representatives
Jimmy Klingler (born 1972), American football player
Werner Klingler (1903–1972), German film director and actor